Argyria argyrostola is a moth in the family Crambidae. It was described by George Hampson in 1919. It is found in Venezuela.

References

Argyriini
Moths described in 1919
Moths of South America